End of an Era is a DVD and double CD from Finnish symphonic metal band Nightwish. Nuclear Blast recorded their live performance at the Hartwall Arena in Helsinki, Finland, on 21 October 2005, the final concert of a long worldwide tour for their album Once. During the concert the band was joined on-stage by John Two-Hawks, who performed "Stone People" from his album Honor as an introduction to "Creek Mary's Blood", which featured his voice and cedar flutes. End of an Era is the final Nightwish production to feature Tarja Turunen on vocals. She was dismissed by a letter after this concert.

In addition to original Nightwish songs, three significant covers appear, their known cover of Gary Moore's "Over the Hills and Far Away", Andrew Lloyd Webber's "The Phantom of the Opera", and a cover of Pink Floyd's "High Hopes".

The running time of the concert is 1 hour and 43 minutes. The DVD also contains a 55-minute documentary about the fifteen days prior to the concert, A Day Before Tomorrow, and a photo gallery.

The Blu-ray Disc version was released on 29 May 2009.

Track listing

Chart performance 
The DVD was released on 1 June 2006 in Finland and on 2 June 2006 in Germany. After only one day on sale, the DVD was certified gold in Finland, and later sold platinum. End of an Era also was Platinum in Germany and Gold in France and on 2009 in Switzerland.

Sales and certifications

References

External links
 Nightwish's Official Website
 

Nightwish video albums
Nightwish albums
2006 video albums
2006 live albums
Live video albums